Nurayum Pathayum is a 1977 Indian Malayalam-language film, directed and produced by J. D. Thottan. The film stars Madhu, Adoor Bhasi, P. J. Antony and Sankaradi in the lead roles. The film has musical score by G. Devarajan.

Cast
Madhu
Adoor Bhasi
P. J. Antony
Sankaradi
Shobha
Prathapachandran
Bahadoor
Kanakadurga
Sadhana

Soundtrack
The music was composed by G. Devarajan with lyrics by Vayalar Ramavarma and P. Bhaskaran.

References

External links
 

1977 films
1970s Malayalam-language films
Films directed by J. D. Thottan